The Old Swimmin' Hole is a 1940 American drama film directed by Robert F. McGowan.

Plot 
Teenager Betty Elliott has decided to take over the business and social affairs of her father Doc Elliott. She thinks her father should marry the widowed mother, Julie Harper, of her boyfriend Chris Harper. Doc has been a real friend and father to Chris, who, under his guidance, has learned to take care of all the sick animals in town, but lack of money keeps the widow from sending Chris on to finish high school and medical training is out of the question.

Wealthy Grandpa Harper sends his attorney Baker to tell Mrs. Harper that all of Jimmy's dreams could be realized if the widow, whom the grandfather dislikes, would give up custody of her son. The lawyer also begins to court Julie and this throws a kink in Betty's plans to see her father and the widow get married.

Cast 
Marcia Mae Jones as Betty Elliott
Jackie Moran as Chris Carter
Leatrice Joy as Mrs. Julie Carter
Charles D. Brown as Doc Elliott
Theodore von Eltz as Baker, Grandpa's Lawyer
George Cleveland as Grandpa Harper
Dix Davis as Jimmy

Soundtrack

External links 

1940 films
American black-and-white films
1940 drama films
Monogram Pictures films
American drama films
1940s English-language films
1940s American films